The 1923 Oldenburg state election was held on 10 June 1923 to elect the 48 members of the Landtag of the Free State of Oldenburg.

Results

1924 Birkenfeld by-election
As a result of the by-election held in Oldenburg's Birkenfeld district in May 1924, the German People's Party seats decreased to 11 and the Communist Party seats increased to 3.

References

Oldenburg
Elections in Lower Saxony